Asdal is a village in Arendal municipality in Agder county, Norway.  The village is located along Norwegian County Road 407 between the European route E18 highway and the river Nidelva.  The village sits between the village of Fevik to the south and the town of Arendal to the northeast. The village of Vrengen lies immediately north of Asdal and the village of Rød lies across the river to the southeast.

References

Villages in Agder
Arendal
Populated coastal places in Norway